Wallington County Grammar School (WCGS) is a selective state boys' grammar school with a coeducational Sixth Form located in the London Borough of Sutton. From 1968 to the mid-1990s the school was known as Wallington High School for Boys. One of a handful of grammar schools in the borough, it is consistently ranked as one of the top performing state schools in the country based on its GCSE and A-level results.

History 
WCGS opened on 19 September 1927 on the 33rd birthday of its founding headmaster, W.T. Hutchins, with 71 pupils, half a mile from the current site. The building had a single storey, with a wooden extension. The school moved to its present site on Croydon Road in 1935.

During the Second World War, WCGS was damaged by a V-2 bomb. All windows were blown out and the roof collapsed. WCGS continued to function, with teachers and students working to rebuild the structure. 52 old boys were killed in action.

The 1950s to 1970s marked a period of expansion and development for the school beyond its original structure as new buildings were constructed to meet the growing number of pupils. The "New Block" ("English Block"), which contains laboratories and classrooms, was opened in 1952. It now houses all English and drama classes, as well as the dining hall. From the late 1950s until 1972, the first two years of the school were housed in classrooms at Carew Manor, half a mile away in Beddington Park. The Sixth Form block, located near the school playing fields, was completed in 1973, now containing classrooms instead.

In 1997, an old boy of WCGS, Chris Woodhead who was then HM Chief Inspector of Schools, opened a new science block. This block contains science classrooms, laboratories and various science department administration offices. The second part of the building's development was completed in 2000.

Girls were admitted to the sixth form from September 1999. WCGS gained academy status on 1 June 2011.

Construction of a new DT and Music block was completed in August 2019, to be opened for the academic year 2019–20.

Jamal Ottun, a Year 12 student at the school, died after drowning in a lake at a swimming trip on the school's annual Canada Rugby Tour. It was later determined by an inquest that Ottun was pushed into Shawnigan Lake, Vancouver Island by a fellow student. In his memory, the "Jamal Ottun Scholarship" was founded, a £5,000 grant given by the Ottun family to support the tuition fees of students who "exemplify the values that Jamal embodied in his time at the school".

Headteachers

 Mr W.T. Hutchins, 1927–1959
 Mr J. Hitchin, 1959–1975
 Mr R.S. Harrison, 1975–1990
 Dr J. Martin Haworth, 1990–2009
 Mr Peter Smart, Acting 2009–2010; permanent 2010–2013
 Mr Jonathan Wilden, 2013–2016
 Mr Jonathan Wilden, Executive Headteacher of Folio Education Trust, 2016 – present
 Mr Jamie Bean, Head Of School, 2016 – present

WCGS joined the Folio Education Trust during the administration of Jonathan Wilden, whereupon he assumed the title of "Executive Headteacher" for the schools comprising the Trust, with Jamie Bean having since taken over local control as the acting headmaster of the school.

Houses 

On admission to the School, all pupils are assigned to one of six Houses, a vertical system which brings everyone together and is rooted firmly in the traditions of the School. Pupils represent their houses in competitions all throughout the school year. The leading house wins the Cock House Cup.

Academic performance 
Academic performance at Wallington County Grammar School is outstanding, with students entering WCGS with very high levels of attainment. Progress and attainment in the Sixth Form are also exceptional. In the latest Ofsted report from 2017, WCGS was rated 'outstanding' in all areas, including Achievement, Behaviour and Safety of pupils; Quality of teaching, learning and assessment; Personal development and Welfare; 16 to 19 study programmes; and Leadership and Management.

WCGS was awarded "science college" status in 2005 for its excellence in science and mathematics. This meant extra funding for the school, which helped to further improve the standard of the school's science department. More recently, WCGS was awarded a second specialism - "WCGS Applied Learning".

In February 2019, the school won the Evening Standard's Outstanding Academic Achievement Award, while its latest 'Progress 8' score places it amongst the top four percent of mainstream state-funded schools in the UK.

Notable alumni 
The following is a list of notable former pupils educated at Wallington, known as Old Walcountians:

John M. Allegro, archaeologist and Dead Sea Scrolls scholar, author of The Sacred Mushroom and the Cross
 Douglas Allen, Baron Croham GCB FRSA, senior civil servant
Neil Ardley, musician, author
Harold Barlow FRS, engineer, Pender Chair of University College London, Department of Electronic and Electrical Engineering, 1950–1966
Herbert Barrie FRCPCH, paediatrician, co-founder of the Neonatal Society and the British Association of Perinatal Medicine
David Bond, journalist, BBC sports editor 2009–2014
John Cameron, composer, musician and recording artist, wrote theme music for Top of the Pops, orchestrator of Les Misérables
Ryan Cummins, retired county cricketer, (Leicestershire and Northamptonshire)
Paul Deighton, Baron Deighton KBE, investment banker, executive of London Organising Committee for the Olympic Games 2012
Sunny Edwards, professional flyweight and super flyweight boxer
Jim Horne, sleep neuroscientist and Professor Emeritus at University of Loughborough, England
Norman Long, social anthropologist and Professor Emeritus at Wageningen University, Netherlands
Mark Pallen, Professor of Microbial Genomics at the University of East Anglia, captain of winning team from Imperial College in University Challenge, 1995–96
John Randall CBE, former President of the National Union of Students, senior civil servant
Nick Ross, ex-presenter of Crimewatch
Malcolm Savidge, former Member of Parliament for Aberdeen North
M. J. Seaton FRS, Professor of Physics at University College London, President of the Royal Astronomical Society
Mark Thurston, engineer, Chief Executive Officer of HS2 rail network project
Ivan Tyrrell, psychotherapist, educator and artist, founder of The Therapist journal (now 'Human Givens'), Director of Human Givens College
Philip Wilcocks CB, DSC, DL, Royal Navy officer (Rear Admiral)
Sir Christopher Woodhead, former HM Chief Inspector of Schools
Philip Yea, Vodafone Director, chair of British Heart Foundation

References

External links 
 School website

Grammar schools in the London Borough of Sutton
Educational institutions established in 1927
Academies in the London Borough of Sutton
Boys' schools in London
1927 establishments in England